Mangano is a surname of Italian origin. Notable people with the surname include:

 Anthony Mangano, American actor
 Ed Mangano (born 1962), Nassau County Executive since 2010
 Guy James Mangano (born 1930), New York politician and judge
 Joy Mangano (born 1956), American inventor
 Lawrence Mangano (1892–1944), American mobster
 Philip Mangano (1898–1951), American mafioso
 Silvana Mangano (1930–1989), Italian actress
 Venero Mangano (1921–2017), American mafioso
 Vincent Mangano (1888–1951), American mafioso
 Vittorio Mangano (1940–2000), Italian member of Cosa Nostra

See also
 Maingano, a fish in the family Cichlidae, scientific name Melanochromis cyaneorhabdos

Italian-language surnames